Andrew Pearson may refer to:

Andrew Pearson (cricketer) (born 1957), English cricketer
Andrew Pearson (runner) (born 1971), English cross country runner
Drew Pearson (journalist) (1897–1969), American columnist
Andy Pearson, mixologist
Andrew Pearson (director) (born 1971) English film and theatre maker

See also
Drew Pearson (disambiguation)